Michael Cartellone (born June 7, 1962) is an American musician and artist. He was a founding member of Damn Yankees and is the current drummer of Lynyrd Skynyrd since 1999.

Biography 
Michael Cartellone was born on June 7, 1962, in Cleveland, Ohio.

Cartellone is the former drummer of Damn Yankees (1989–1996, 1998–2001) and a former drummer for Accept (1996). After Damn Yankees broke up, Cartellone worked as the touring drummer for Ted Nugent and later John Fogerty before settling in with Lynyrd Skynyrd.

Cartellone has toured and recorded with a wide variety of artists including Adrian Belew, Jack Blades (after the dissolution of Damn Yankees), Cher, John Fogerty, Peter Frampton, Brad Gillis, Wolf Hoffmann, Eddie Jobson, Freddie Mercury, Tommy Shaw (before and after the formation of Damn Yankees), Shaw Blades, Joe Lynn Turner, and John Wetton.

Cartellone is the drummer on former Faith No More singer Chuck Mosley's 2009 album, Will Rap Over Hard Rock for Food.

He is also an accomplished painter and ardent Charlie Chaplin and Cleveland Indians fan.

Cartellone uses Pearl drums, pedals and hardware and Zildjian cymbals, most notably the A and A custom series, but previously used the Z custom series in the past, and he also uses Remo drumheads.

Discography 

Damn Yankees
Damn Yankees, 1990
Don't Tread, 1992
Extended Versions, 2008

Freddie Mercury
"In My Defence", The Great Pretender, 1992

Vince Neil
"You're Invited But Your Friends Can't Come", Encino Man (Music From The Original Motion Picture Soundtrack), 1992

Brad Gillis
Gilrock Ranch, 1993

John Wetton
Battle Lines, 1994
The Studio Recordings Anthology, 2015

Shaw Blades
Hallucination, 1995

Accept
Predator, 1996

Peter Frampton
"The Frightened City", Twang! – A Tribute To Hank Marvin & The Shadows 1996

Wolf Hoffmann
Classical, 1997

Lynyrd SkynyrdEdge of Forever, 1999Christmas Time Again, 2000Vicious Cycle, 2003Lynyrd Skynyrd Lyve: The Vicious Cycle Tour, 2004God & Guns, 2009Live from Freedom Hall, 2010Last of a Dyin' Breed, 2012Pronounced 'Lĕh-'nérd 'Skin-'nérd & Second Helping Live From Jacksonville At The Florida Theatre, 2015

Steve FisterAge of Great Dreams, 1999

Jack BladesJack Blades, 2004

Joe Lynn TurnerSecond Hand Life, 2007

Joe BouchardJukebox in My Head, 2009

Chuck MosleyWill Rap Over Hard Rock for Food'', 2009

References

External links 
Official website

Down South Jukin': Michael Cartellone Down South Jukin' Interview, Part 1 (Music questions), June 2004
Down South Jukin': Audio Interviews with Michael (in RealAudio Metadata format – requires compatible player)

1962 births
Accept (band) members
American rock drummers
Damn Yankees (band) members
Living people
Lynyrd Skynyrd members
Musicians from Ohio
People from Solon, Ohio
20th-century American drummers
American male drummers
American people of Italian descent
Blues rock musicians